The Minzu University of China (MUC) is a national public university in Beijing, China. The university is affiliated with the National Ethnic Affairs Commission of China.

The university is a member of the Double First Class University (Class-A), the former Project 211, and the former Project 985. Minzu University ranked first in China among universities for ethnic minorities. It aims to be one of the best universities of its kind in the world for inheriting and promoting the excellent culture of all ethnic groups. With the strong support of Chinese government, it has developed rapidly over the years. MUC is one of the most prestigious universities in China in ethnology, anthropology, ethnic economies, regional economics, religion studies, history, dance, and fine arts.

Name

The Chinese name has the meaning "central ethnic university", suggesting a national-level university focused on serving minority ethnic groups. The old English name translated the ethnic term as "nationalities", based on the term used in German and Russian language Marxist texts. On 20 November 2008, the university changed its official English name, apparently citing concerns that "central" might imply a location in the geographical centre of China (as it does in South-Central University for Nationalities), and the old name did not sound good. The name change of Renmin University has been cited as a precedent. The new name obscures the university's ethnic character, although student opinion has focused more on the fact that it makes obsolete the university's nickname, "the village". The Chinese word for village has a Hanyu pinyin spelling similar to the English abbreviation "CUN". In mainland Chinese culture, villages have homely connotations.

Academic programmes

The university awards undergraduate-level degrees in 55 academic subjects, usually after four years of study. There are 64 master's and 25 doctoral programmes. While young people from the majority Han group are the largest single ethnicity among the 15,000 students, 60% of the students and more than one third of the academic staff are from other nationalities. In addition to traditional course offerings the school offers special majors and courses such as ethnology, ethnic languages, and minority literature.

By far the strongest research areas are anthropology and ethnology, which are the mainstays of its small publishing house and journal. In 2001, the People's Daily described CUN as "China's top academy for ethnic studies." Other respected departments are the dance school and the minority language and literature departments. Other subjects are often studied from the ethnic minorities' perspective, e.g., biology courses may focus on the flora and fauna in ethnic minority areas of China.

Minzu University participates actively in social sciences research. Its social science departments predominantly do their research with an ethnic perspective and has achieved leading research results in China in ethnic economies, regional economics, legal studies in ethnic minorities regions, ethnic administration. In particular, its economics, management, law and history departments are growing into be dynamic research institutions with the help of Project 985.

The university is the pinnacle of a national network of institutions maintained by the State Ethnic Affairs Commission, although academic standards are also monitored by the State Education Commission, which means some students end up sitting for two sets of exams.

Students are required to take courses on Chinese minority theories and Marxism.

In English-speaking countries, Minzu University's main partner is the University of East London, United Kingdom.

Rankings and reputation 

Minzu University is ranked first in China among universities that originated as "ethnic minorities". In 2020, Minzu University of China ranked 582nd among the universities around the world by SCImago Institutions Rankings.

It also ranked 301-350th in Asia by the QS Asia University Rankings and 271-280th among BRICS countries by the QS BRICS University Rankings. 

Internationally, Minzu University of China was ranked amongst top 2000 in the world by the Center for World University Rankings (CWUR) and University Ranking by Academic Performance.

History
The Communist Party of China first established a Nationalities Institute in its Civil War stronghold of Yan'an, in central China, in October 1941. In 1950-1952, this was merged with other ethnolinguistic and sociological departments, including elements of Peking University and Tsinghua University. The result was the Central Institute for Nationalities, which was established in 1951 and officially opened on 11 June 1952. The institute was assigned a large area of parkland on the outskirts of Beijing as its campus.

Both the Yan'an and Central institutes were intended to train cadres (officials) for ethnic minority areas, as well as providing a liberal arts education for promising students from the minorities. The cadres were to be trained so they could serve as liaisons between their minority communities and the Chinese government. Their research was and is intended to support the policies of the State Ethnic Affairs Commission. In its early years, the institute was caught up in the sensitive issue of classifying China's vast population into official ethnic groups, until the Cultural Revolution made conventional education almost impossible.

With the advent of Deng Xiaoping's reform and opening up policy (c. 1978), the institute went through considerable changes. On the downside, it lost most of its campus to development projects; it is now in a heavily built-up area. Financial pressures in the early 21st century led to a rapid rise in student numbers, particularly of Han students.

On the upside, the institute expanded into science subjects during the 1980s and achieved university status on 30 November 1993. In 1999 it was granted "key university" status, as part of Project 211, which was supposed to identify 100 Chinese universities that would play leading roles in the 21st century. Since 2004 the university has been a participant in Project 985, a major national programme to raise 39 universities to world-class status. The campus has been almost completely reconstructed as part of this programme.

Meanwhile, Haidian has continued to develop as Beijing's main university district. CUN is now adjacent to the National Library of China and Zhongguancun, which local media refer to as "China's silicon valley." In 2006 a large site was acquired in Beijing's Fengtai district, and it is likely that a second campus will be constructed there.

Admissions

To ensure that members of the 56 recognized minority groups are admitted the school has fixed quotas for each group. As of 2011, Minzu University accepts National Higher Education Entrance Examination (Gaokao) scores with a minimum in the mid-400s, or below the 50th percentile. Out of the Beijing universities, this has one of the lowest acceptance requirements.

In China a university may admit a student whose score is barely below the cutoff score at its discretion. Sometimes minimum score levels were lowered to ensure that students from among the least-accepted minority groups would be permitted entry. The school offers remedial courses, including a one-year tutorial course that reviews the final year of senior secondary school and remedial Chinese courses to assist minority students to enroll.

The university has bridging programs to select minority students at Chinese secondary schools who are high achieving so they can attend Minzu University to prepare them for entering the highest ranked universities in Beijing. The government pays tuition for these programs.

Notable students and faculty
 Arken Abdulla, Uyghur and Mandarin Chinese language pop singer-songwriter 
 Kahar Barat, Uyghur-American historian
 Fei Xiaotong, sociologist and anthropologist
 D. O. Chaoke, Evenki linguist
 Han Geng, Mandopop singer and actor
 Song Zuying, an ethnic Miao singer of classical Chinese and Western songs, who performed at the 2008 Summer Olympics closing ceremony
 Ilham Tohti, an ethnic Uyghur, who was a professor of economics at Minzu University. He was detained by police in July 2009 following riots in Ürümqi In September 2014 he was sentenced to life in prison by the Urumqi People's Intermediate Court.
Ulan Tuya (born 1983), Chinese singer/songwriter 
Wu'erkaixi, dissident, student leader of the 1989 Tiananmen protests
 Zhang Chengzhi, writer, once audited a class in Kazakh
 Kao Chin Su-mei, Taiwanese Aborigine actress, singer and member for parliament in the Legislative Yuan of the Republic of China (Taiwan) for Highland Aborigines electoral district
 Xu Han, professor at Minzu University (graduated from Tsinghua University) and creator of Ali the Fox
 Mi Na, contemporary artist

See also
 Demographics of Beijing
Other universities for ethnic minorities in the People's Republic of China:
 South-Central University for Nationalities
 Southwest Minzu University
 Northwest Minzu University
 North Minzu University
 Dalian Minzu University
 Guangxi University for Nationalities
 Yunnan University for Nationalities
 Qinghai University for Nationalities
 Inner Mongolia University for Nationalities

Notes
The Central University for Nationalities (undated, but c.2000). Beijing: CUN International Relations Office. A prospectus for Chinese and foreign students; the source for many of the dates and statistics in the first section.

References

External links
 

 
Project 211
Project 985
Plan 111
Educational institutions established in 1941
Universities and colleges in Haidian District
Major National Historical and Cultural Sites in Beijing
1941 establishments in China
Minzu Universities